Paul C. van Oorschot is a cryptographer and computer security researcher, currently a professor of computer science at Carleton University in Ottawa, Ontario, where he holds the Canada Research Chair in Authentication and Computer Security. He is a Fellow of the Royal Society of Canada (FRSC).  He is best known as co-author of the Handbook of Applied Cryptography, together with Alfred Menezes and Scott Vanstone. Van Oorschot was awarded the 2000 J.W. Graham Medal in Computing Innovation. He also helped organize the first Selected Areas in Cryptography (SAC) workshop in 1994. 

Van Oorschot received his Ph.D. in 1988 from the University of Waterloo.
He was recognized (2016) as a Fellow of the Association for Computing Machinery for "contributions to applied cryptography, authentication and computer security." He is also a Fellow of the IEEE (2019).
His most recent book is Computer Security and the Internet: Tools and Jewels from Malware to Bitcoin (2nd edition, 2021; Springer International).

See also
 List of University of Waterloo people

References

External links
 Paul van Oorschot's page at Carleton University
 Handbook of Applied Cryptography home
 Bio at On the Identity Trail

Year of birth missing (living people)
Living people
Modern cryptographers
Public-key cryptographers
Canadian computer scientists
Canada Research Chairs
Academic staff of Carleton University
University of Waterloo alumni
J.W. Graham Medal awardees
Fellows of the Association for Computing Machinery